Apotomops carchicola is a species of moth of the family Tortricidae. It is found in Carchi Province, Ecuador.

References

Moths described in 2000
Euliini
Moths of South America
Taxa named by Józef Razowski